is a professional Japanese Nippon Professional Baseball player. He is currently with the Tohoku Rakuten Golden Eagles in Japan's Pacific League.

External links

1977 births
Japanese baseball players
Living people
Nippon Professional Baseball pitchers
Baseball people from Mie Prefecture
Saitama Seibu Lions players
Seibu Lions players
Tohoku Rakuten Golden Eagles players